FaZe Clan, or simply FaZe, is a professional esports and entertainment organization headquartered in Los Angeles, California, United States. Founded on May 30, 2010, as FaZe Sniping, the organization has players from around the world, across multiple games, including Call of Duty, Counter-Strike: Global Offensive, PlayerUnknown's Battlegrounds, Tom Clancy's Rainbow Six Siege, Halo Infinite, Valorant, Fortnite Battle Royale, Rocket League, and Super Smash Bros. Ultimate. In 2020, the organization expanded into the Asian market, acquiring a Thai PUBG Mobile and FIFA Online roster.

History 
FaZe Sniping made its debut on YouTube on May 30, 2010. Originally, the group were a Call of Duty clan founded by three players, Eric "CLipZ" Rivera, Jeff "House Cat" Emann (now known as "Timid") and Ben "Resistance" Christensen. The trio garnered a reputation for innovating trickshotting in the game Call of Duty: Modern Warfare 2. Their YouTube content took off when Ted "Fakie" joined the clan. It was then when FaZe unveiled the most popular series on their channel, ILLCAMS. FaZe Clan's focus on trickshotting and a personality/social-media approach led to FaZe Clan becoming one of the first popular YouTube video game channels, compared to other Call of Duty channels which were focused on winning tournaments. In 2012, the channel had one million subscribers, and the clan began to branch out into esports competitions. Teams under the FaZe name began competing in competitions such as the Call of Duty Championship and Counter-Strike: Global Offensive Major Championships, who were separate from the clan's YouTube content creators, splitting members of FaZe Clan into two mostly autonomous camps. Originally, FaZe Clan did not have a corporate structure, however the original CEO was Brazilian Thomas "Temperrr" Oliveira, who had been a member of FaZe since he was 16 years old. Oliveira and COO Richard “Banks” Bengston created the first FaZe shared home in 2014 in Plainview, New York, where they could incorporate lifestyle content with their gaming content.

In 2015, former social media platform Hubrick, run by Norwegian entrepreneur Sebastian Guerts, decided to invest in FaZe Clan. Hubrick recruited former record executive Lee Trink to serve as CEO. In January 2016, FaZe Clan acquired European esports team G2 Esports's Counter-Strike: Global Offensive international lineup, who competed as FaZe Clan in the 2016 MLG Major Championship: Columbus, The team won second place in ELEAGUE Major: Boston 2018, losing to US-based Cloud9. In 2017, Bengston moved to Los Angeles, starting a new shared home with YouTubers called the Clout House. FaZe Clan were the runners up in ESL Pro League Season 6 in 2017, and second runners up of ESL Pro League Season 7 and ESL One Cologne 2018. FaZe Clan were the champions of ELeague CS:GO Premier in 2017, winning $500,000 of prize money.

In 2018, Greg Selkoe, founder of streetware web retailer Karmaloop, became the president of FaZe Clan, with CEO Lee Trink stepping into the CEO role full-time. In late 2018, FaZe Clan opened its series A funding round. Throughout 2019, musicians Ray J, DJ Paul, Offset, Swae Lee, Yo Gotti, Pitbull, and Disco Fries, basketball players Meyers Leonard, Josh Hart, Ben Simmons, Jamal Murray, footballer Gregory van der Wiel, skateboarder Nyjah Huston, radio host Big Boy, music executives Sylvia Rhone, Troy Carter and Guy Oseary and actor Chris O'Donnell invested in FaZe Clan. In December 2019, FaZe closed its series A led by entrepreneur Jimmy Iovine and mobile e-commerce platform NTWRK.

In January 2020, FaZe Clan obtained a $22.7 million investment loan from a private lender. FaZe was advised on the transaction by Canaccord Genuity, a Canadian financial company. On June 18, 2020, FaZe Clan announced its co-ownership of CTRL, a food supplement company. In December 2020, FaZe Clan was worth $305 million. That same month the revenue of FaZe Clan was estimated $40 million. It also released the film Crimson under FaZe Studios in 2020, with Brian "Rug" Awadis in a leading role.

On June 10, 2021, FaZe Clan became the first esports team to be featured on the cover of Sports Illustrated. As part of this merge, FaZe would receive  from B. Riley, and would be renamed to Faze Holdings Inc. and refocus itself as a brand for "the voice of youth culture". The merger was approved by the U.S. Securities and Exchange Commission, and the company went public on July 20, 2022, however with a lower than announced valuation of $725 million.

Also in 2021, FaZe Clan member Frazier Khattrri (FaZe Kay) would become one of the lead promoters of Save the Kids token, a pump and dump altcoin which was additionally promoted by FaZe members Jarvis, Teeqo and Nikan. Upon the token's launch and revelation to the public that it was a pump and dump, FaZe removed Kay and suspended Jarvis, Teeqo, and Nikan for their involvement.

In July 2022, FaZe Clan became a publicly traded company. The company had only received portion of the money they were promised by private investors ahead of their merge with B. Riley Principal 150 Merger Group. On January 20, 2023, the price of their stock fell below a dollar for the first time, which lead them to be at risk of being delisted. According to Nasdaq policy, if a company's stock is under $1 for more than a month, the company will receive a deficiency notice, in which they have 180 days for the stock to be $1 or more for ten consecutive business days. As of February 15, 2023, the stock was at $0.76.

Trink, the CEO, had expressed concerns and had stated that the company is working towards a solution to their problem. As of September 2022, it has been reported that the organization has enough money to last them until November 2023.

In February 2023, FaZe Clan laid off 20% of its staff. According to the CEO, Lee Trink, It was a result of the uncertainty of the economy. He had also stated that the company will focus on financial discipline. Despite the changes, Trink is confident that revenue will continue to grow for the organization. He reported that the revenue growth for 2022 was a 25% increase from 2021.

Current divisions

Call of Duty

FaZe France 
On September 19, 2013, FaZe eSniping, their competitive Call of Duty sniping division, was announced with the joining of Raphael "Zydar" Zydar, Elliot "Hyspe" and Kevin "RanbOw", led by Anil "WaRTeK" Brancaleoni. On April 3, 2014, FaZe Clan announced the rebranding of FaZe eSniping to FaZe France. RanbOw left the team after one and a half years, with Anthony "Toto" replacing him. On May 26, 2015, the players and staff of FaZe France stated they weren't satisfied with FaZe's plans and left to create their own organization.

Atlanta FaZe 

On May 2, 2019, Activision Blizzard announced that Atlanta Esports Ventures had purchased one of the first five franchise slots for the Call of Duty League. According to ESPN, the publisher was looking to sell slots for approximately $25 million per team. "We have the opportunity to—once again—play a pivotal role in Atlanta's diverse esports community by bringing the future of Call of Duty esports to the city," said Hamilton in a release at the time. AEV and FaZe Clan partnered together for the team, and in October 2019, they announced that the team would be named the Atlanta FaZe.

Rosters

Partnerships and collaborations 
FaZe Clan has been partnered with caffeinated drink mix brand Gamma Labs' G Fuel since 2012, which is currently one of the longest promotional collaborations in esports. As a part of the collaboration, the company released FaZe-themed flavors, such as "FaZe Clan's Battle Juice" in 2019. On May 2, 2019, Atlanta Esports Ventures announced the purchase of a franchise spot in Call of Duty league in partnership with FaZe Clan. The resulting team, Atlanta FaZe, was announced on October 26, 2019.

On November 22, 2018, FaZe Clan collaborated with sportswear manufacturer Champion to release exclusive clothing. In 2019, Champion released exclusive clothing with FaZe on four occasions. Champion manufactures most of the clothing released by FaZe. On March 14, 2019, FaZe Clan collaborated with clothing brand Siberia Hills for a limited-time hoodie release.

On March 21, 2019, FaZe Clan announced its partnership with automobile manufacturer Nissan. Nissan started producing two original series on FaZe's YouTube channel.

On September 26, 2019, football club Manchester City announced its partnership with FaZe Clan for content creation and clothing.

On July 20, 2019, FaZe Clan opened a booth at ComplexCon 2019, where they sold exclusive clothing in collaboration with Champion, label Lyrical Lemonade and clothing brand 24karats. They collaborated with 24karats again on August 16, 2019, to release clothing accessories, and with Lyrical Lemonade on November 27 of the same year. On September 17, 2019, FaZe Clan collaborated with headwear company New Era. Through November 3 to 22, 2019, FaZe Clan collaborated with designer Warren Lotas, sportswear brand Kappa and clothing brand CLOT respectively to release exclusive clothing.

In August 2021, FaZe Clan announced a sponsorship with McDonald's. The companies will partner on a series of content and other projects featuring major FaZe Clan stars.

In September 2021, FaZe Clan and DC Comics collaborated on a limited edition comic book, written by Josh Trujillo and illustrated by Scot Eaton, featuring Batman and several members of the FaZe Clan.

In January 2023, FaZe Clan announced a shoe collaboration with Nike. This collaboration came in the form of a Nike LeBron Nxxt Gen with the co-branding and colors of FaZe Clan. The shoe was debuted in a game played by Sierra Canyon, the school where Bronny James, LeBron James' son, played for.

In February 2023, FaZe Clan announced a collaboration with A Bathing Ape (BAPE). The collaboration was said to include a number of FaZe Clan and BAPE branded apparel and accessories.

On February 22, 2023, FaZe Clan announced a collaboration with GHOST Energy. This collaboration came in the form of an energy drink with an new flavor called "FaZe Pop." The drink is said to be zero sugar, have no artificial flavorings, and contain 200 mg of caffeine.

Philanthropy 
On March 15, 2020, FaZe Clan unveiled Fight 2 Fund, its four-week charity Call of Duty: Warzone event, in which social media influencers, YouTubers, streamers, celebrities, sportspeople and musicians participate. Viewers could donate money, which would be donated to charities helping people impacted by the coronavirus disease 2019. The event raised over $124,000.

References

External links
 
FaZe Clan on Instagram

 
2010 establishments in the United States
Esports teams established in 2010
American Internet groups
Call of Duty teams
Counter-Strike teams
Defunct and inactive Overwatch teams
Esports teams based in the United States
PlayerUnknown's Battlegrounds teams
Tom Clancy's Rainbow Six Siege teams
Valorant teams
Gaming-related YouTube channels
English YouTube groups
American YouTube groups